"Kempy Kay" is Child ballad no. 33.

Synopsis
A deformed suitor woos a hideous maiden, each of whom is described in bawdy detail. Finally, they exchange disgusting gifts, and the match is made.

See also
List of the Child Ballads

References

Child Ballads
Year of song unknown